Dizavar may refer to:
 Dizəvər, Azerbaijan
 Dizavar, Iran